Khadidja Latreche (born 1990) is an Algerian chess player.  She played for the Algerian women's teams which won the gold medal at the 2011 Pan Arab Games and silver medal at the 2011 All-African Games, and which competed at the 2008, 2010 and 2012 Chess Olympiads.

References

External links 
chess games entry

Living people
Algerian female chess players
1990 births
African Games silver medalists for Algeria
African Games medalists in chess
Competitors at the 2011 All-Africa Games
21st-century Algerian women